The Society of Ship-Owners of Great Britain (SOGB) was an organisation established by British ship-owners in 1802 to defend their interests by opposing breaches of the Navigation Acts. The decision to form the organisation was reached at a meeting held on 22 June in London.

The ship owners were concerned that while their operating costs such as taxation, naval supplies, wages and insurance, had increased, foreign competition meant their freight rates were kept low. Many ships stood idle while others ran at a loss. They campaigned for American ships to be excluded from British colonies and fought the American Intercourse Bill of 1806.

Membership
The SOGB was organised around port committees with the principal committee being that of London.

Members of the London Committee
The committee was composed as follows:
Chairman: John Hill (also trustee)
 Joseph and Peter Ainsley
 John Akenhead
 Thomas and Robert Brown
 John Blacket
 Ralph Clarke
 William Clark (junior)
 Norrison Coverdale
 Robert Curling
 William Curling
 Anthony Collins
 Joseph and W. Dowson
 Thomas Davison
 James Dunning
 George French
 William Fairles
 Henry Fletcher
 Thomas Gillespy (Trustee)
 Sir Cuthbert Heron
 Heathfield, Pycroft and Heathfield
 William Havelock
 Thomas Hayman
 Ives Hurry
 Hough and Jackson
 Archibald Heurtley
 John Jackson
 Thomas Keddey
 Peter Kennion
 John Lyall
 William Marshall
 Richard Mordey
 William Moorsom
 Thomas Metcalfe
 William Masterman
 D. Macarthy
 Robert Pedder
 Thomas Rowcroft
 Joshua Reeve
 Isaac Robinson (trustee)
 John Shuttleworth
 Henry Smithers
 Daniel Stephens
 J. R. Sherman
 William Thompson
 John Tulloch
 Thomas and George Wilkinson
 Richard Wilson (junior)
 Thomas S. Williams
 John Woodcock
Nathaniel Atcheson was appointed secretary for both the London Committee and that of the society as a whole.

Other ports
Secretaries were appointed for other ports:
 North Shields: William Harrison
 South Shields: William Blackburn
 Sunderland: Thomas Sanderson
Ship owners from Bristol, Leith, Kirkcaldy, Bridlington and various other ports expressed an interest in supporting the association.

Publications
The SOGB published material relevant to shipowners and their campaigns.
 Collection of Interesting and Important Reports and Papers on the Navigation and Trade of Great Britain, Ireland, and the British Colonies in the West Indies and America, 1807

References

Shipping trade associations
Employers' organizations
Organizations established in 1802
1802 establishments in the United Kingdom
Organisations based in London